Famous Music Corporation was the worldwide music publishing division of Paramount Pictures, a division of Paramount Global since 1994. Its copyright holdings span several decades and includes music from such Academy Award-winning motion pictures as The Godfather and Forrest Gump.

Founding
It was founded in 1928 by Paramount’s predecessor, the Famous-Lasky Corporation, to publish music from its "talking pictures." Some of the classic songs in the Famous Music catalog that originated in motion pictures include "Thanks for the Memory" (The Big Broadcast of 1936), "Silver Bells", "Mona Lisa)" (from Captain Carey, U.S.A.), "Moon River" (from Breakfast at Tiffany's), "Where Do I Begin?" (the theme from Love Story), "Speak Softly, Love" (the theme from The Godfather), "Up Where We Belong", "Footloose"  (from Footloose (film) "Take My Breath Away" (from Top Gun)'; and "My Heart Will Go On" (from Titanic (1997 film).

Famous Music additionally owned music and songs from television programs produced by Paramount until ownership of most of those songs was transferred to CBS in 2006 as part of Viacom's split into two separate companies: CBS and "new" Viacom. These included the "Theme from Mission: Impossible" (ownership remained with Paramount), the "Theme from Star Trek", and "Where Everybody Knows Your Name" (the theme from Cheers'').

Famous Music also provided licensing and administration services for many prominent music catalog owners such as CBS, The Clyde Otis Music Catalogs, as well as for other Viacom divisions including MTV, Nickelodeon and BET.

Starting mostly in the late 1980s and continuing until the company was sold in 2007 (see below), Famous Music was active in acquiring songs that did not originate in Paramount motion pictures or television programs. These included the purchase of many works from the Duke Ellington catalog, as well as acquisition or administration agreements with recording artists and producers such as Shakira, Eminem, Akon, She Wants Revenge, Boyz II Men, Paula Cole, The Cunninghams, Björk, Gavin Rossdale, Daniel Powter, Harvey Danger, Martika, KC Porter, Linda Perry, Kike Santander, Irv Gotti, Placebo, Modest Mouse, Jet and P.O.D.

In May 2007, Viacom sold Famous Music to Sony Music Publishing, (then Sony/ATV Music publishing) co-owned by Sony and Michael Jackson for a reported $370m. Famous Music was then renamed Sony/ATV Harmony and Sony/ATV Melody.

In December 2012, Sony/ATV sold the Famous Music UK song catalogue (which included Placebo and The Kooks) to BMG Rights Management. Paramount Pictures moved the administration of its music to Universal Music Publishing Group sometime in the late 2010s; Paramount Media Networks (excluding Showtime Networks) followed suit in 2020.

Famous Music Records Group 
For a number of years, Famous Music also had a record label group division that included Blue Thumb Records, Dot Records and Paramount Records. In 1974 these were acquired by ABC Records for $5.5 million with most of the Famous labels absorbed into ABC Records.

Famous had distribution deals with Neighborhood Records and Sire Records, the latter of which was distributed by ABC until 1977.

The catalogs of all the ABC/Famous Music labels are now owned by Universal Music Group (with some exceptions, for example, the 1968-1970 catalog of Stax Records, which during that period was owned by Famous, is owned by Concord Music Group, itself distributed by UMG.)

Various labels under Universal manage different parts of the catalog depending on the genre. Here are some examples:

Pop, rock, R&B: Geffen Records
Country: MCA Nashville Records
Jazz: Impulse! Records
Classical: Deutsche Grammophon
Musical theater: Decca Broadway

Artists
 Hillary Lindsey
 Green Bottle Records
 John Lee Hooker
 Clockwork
 David Tolk
 Jonathan Mead Radford
 Monifah

References

External links
Famous Music Videos Database Collection

Music publishing companies of the United States
Former Viacom subsidiaries
Former Sony subsidiaries
2007 mergers and acquisitions
Paramount Pictures
Gulf and Western Industries
American companies established in 1928
Entertainment companies established in 1928
Sony Music Publishing